Bigene is a Sector in the Cacheu Region of Guinea-Bissau.

Cacheu Region
Sectors of Guinea-Bissau
Populated places in Guinea-Bissau